Brian Stacy Fee (born January 29, 1975) is an American storyboard artist, animator, prop designer, producer, film director and occasional voice actor who works for Pixar.

Fee made his directorial debut at the studio with the feature film Cars 3 on June 16, 2017.

On July 20, 2017, it was announced that Fee was directing a new Pixar feature film which would be an original screenplay written by him.

Filmography

Films

Independent

Television

Shorts

Other credits

References

External links
 

1975 births
American animated film directors
American animators
American male voice actors
American male screenwriters
American storyboard artists
Film directors from San Francisco
Living people
Artists from San Francisco
Pixar people
Prop designers
Screenwriters from California